Kirsten Dawn Madison (born February 14, 1968) is the Vice President for Government Relations at the National Endowment for Democracy (NED), effective June 27, 2022. Before that, Madison worked for the United States Senate Committee on Homeland Security and Governmental Affairs as the Director of Homeland Security. She served as Assistant Secretary of State for International Narcotics and Law Enforcement Affairs from !ay 11, 2018 until January 20, 2021.

Biography
Madison earned a MSc in European Studies from the London School of Economics in 1991 and a BA in International Relations from Goucher College in 1990.

References

1968 births
Alumni of the London School of Economics
Goucher College alumni
United States Assistant Secretaries of State
Living people